The 72d Fighter Wing was a wing of the United States Army Air Forces. It was assigned to Second Air Force, stationed at Colorado Springs Army Air Base, Colorado. It was inactivated on 9 April 1946.

History
The wing was initially activated as a command and control organization for heavy bomber training. In 1943 it became single-engine fighter training organization for Second Air Force. The wing had jurisdiction for fighter training Operational Training Units and Replacement Training Units in the midwest. Bases assigned to the wing included:

 Abilene Army Air Field, Texas
 Alamogordo Army Air Field, New Mexico
 Bruning Army Air Field, Nebraska
 Casper Army Air Field, Wyoming
 Dalhart Army Air Field, Texas

 DeRidder Army Air Base, Louisiana
 Galveston Army Air Field, Texas
 Harding Field, Louisiana
 Peterson Field, Colorado
 Pocatello Army Air Field, Idaho
 Scribner Army Air Field, Nebraska

Lineage
 Constituted as 72d Bombardment Operational Training Wing (Heavy) on 12 August 1943
 Activated on 20 August 1943
 Redesigned 72d Fighter Wing on 1 September 1943
 Inactivated on 9 April 1946
 Disbanded on 15 June 1983
 Reconstituted on 31 July 1985 and redesigned 372d Electronic Warfare Group
 Disbanded on 9 September 1992

Assignments
 Second Air Force, 12 August 1943 – 9 April 1946

Components
 36th Fighter Group, 17 September 1943 – 4 April 1944
 84th Fighter Group, 1 November 1943 – 1 April 1944
 357th Fighter Group, 7 October – 9 November 1943
 407th Fighter Group, 9 March 1943 – 21 March 1944
 408th Fighter Group, 1 November 1943 – 1 April 1944
 476th Fighter Group, 26 March-1 April 1944
 507th Fighter Group, 12 October 1944 – 24 June 1945
 508th Fighter Group, 12 October 1944 – 6 January 1945

Stations
 Rapid City Army Air Base, South Dakota, 20 August 1943
 Colorado Springs Army Air Base, Colorado, 7 October 1943
 Peterson Field, Colorado, November 1943;
 Colorado Springs Army Air Base, Colorado, December 1945-9 April 1946

Awards
 
 American Theater of World War II

References

Notes

Bibliography

 

Military units and formations in Colorado
072
Military units and formations disestablished in 1946